Harry Young Cochran (born September 1, 1948) is a former Democratic member of the Pennsylvania House of Representatives.

References

1948 births
Democratic Party members of the Pennsylvania House of Representatives
Living people
Place of birth missing (living people)